Peter Kemp may refer to:

 Peter Kemp (civil servant) (1934–2008), British civil servant
 Peter Kemp (rower) (1853–1921), Australian rower
 Peter Kemp (social scientist) (born 1955), British social scientist
 Peter Kemp (swimmer) (1877–1965), British Olympic swimmer and water polo player
 Peter Kemp (writer) (1913–1993), English soldier and writer